Kary Lamont Vincent Sr. (September 19, 1969 – December 26, 2018) was an American football wide receiver who played two seasons in the Arena Football League (AFL) with the Charlotte Rage and Milwaukee Mustangs. After graduating from Thomas Jefferson High School in Port Arthur, Texas, he played college football at Texas A&M University. He was drafted by the New Orleans Saints in the sixth round of the 1992 NFL Draft. He was on the Saints practice squad for two seasons.

Vincent died on December 26, 2018. He was survived by his wife, daughter and three sons.

He was the father of current NFL player Kary Vincent Jr.

References

External links
Just Sports Stats
College stats

1969 births
2018 deaths
Players of American football from Texas
American football wide receivers
American football defensive backs
African-American players of American football
Texas A&M Aggies football players
Charlotte Rage players
Milwaukee Mustangs (1994–2001) players
Sportspeople from Port Arthur, Texas
20th-century African-American sportspeople
21st-century African-American people
Deaths from pneumonia in the United States